Cuves is a commune in the Haute-Marne département in north-eastern France.

Sights and monuments
The Saint Eloi church dates from the 18th century. It houses a processional cross made in 1748 and signed Gillot (a goldsmith from Langres) which has been registered since 1976 as a monument historique French Ministry of Culture.

See also
Communes of the Haute-Marne department

References

Communes of Haute-Marne